The Volkswagen Polo Mk4 is the fourth generation of the Volkswagen Polo supermini car produced by the German manufacturer Volkswagen. It was marketed from early 2002 to 2009 in most countries except Argentina and the USA. It was manufactured in South Africa until 2017, it was sold as the Polo Vivo. The Mk4 replaced the Volkswagen Polo Mk3, while the Polo Vivo replaced the Citi Golf.  In 2018 the Mk4 was replaced by the Volkswagen Polo Mk5 Polo Vivo. In Brazil, It was manufactured until 2014 with a second facelift called 9n4, It was replaced in 2017 by Volkswagen Polo Mk6.

Overview

Launched in September 2001 at the Frankfurt Motor Show, the fourth generation Polo (internal designation Typ 9N) was made available in early 2002. In keeping with Volkswagen's aim of floor pan sharing it shares its platform with the SEAT Ibiza 6L, SEAT Córdoba 6L, Volkswagen Gol Third Generation, also called G5 or N.F.- Not to be confused with Volkswagen Golf - and Škoda Fabia Mk1. The car is all new, and bears more structural resemblance to the 6K than the 6N, outwardly the most recognizable change is the quad round headlights similar to the Volkswagen Lupo.

Release in North America

In January 2009, Volkswagen Group of America CEO Stefan Jacoby announced that the Polo will finally reach North America to join the vehicle line-up as a true entry-level car below the Rabbit. However, the Polo Mk4 was never released in the North American market, leaving the speculation for its successor, the Polo Mk5. When the Mk5 was introduced in European markets, it was not made available for US sale. Due to the increased demand for SUVs, VWoA management confirmed the Mk5 was not slated for a US introduction in the foreseeable future. If the Mk5 had been introduced in the US, it was anticipated to be built at Volkswagen's plant in Puebla, Mexico, alongside the Jetta and New Beetle. As of 2016, there are still no plans to introduce the Polo Mk5 or future generations of the Polo in the US.

Models and specifications
The model range includes the norm for current Volkswagen models, from the Comfortline to the Trendline and Highline, whilst featuring an extensive list of extras that had now become norm in mid-sized small cars. Items such as ABS, power steering, front and side airbags and front and rear head restraints were standard on all models and ESP, brake assistance, air conditioning, satellite navigation etc. were optional on higher spec models.

It is the first Polo generation to use a semi-automatic air conditioning system, with automatic climate control, named Climatic, that adjusts the interior temperature automatically to the value set on the control panel, whereas the air distribution and air blower speed are adjusted manually. A fully automatic air conditioning system, named Climatronic, was also offered.

It was available with a choice of a five-speed manual gearbox, a six-speed manual gearbox, only for the sporty 1.9-litre  diesel model, or with a four-speed automatic gearbox, used only in combination with the 1.4-litre  petrol engine. A six-speed semi-automatic transmission (Tiptronic) was added from mid-2006, after the facelift, also available only with the 1.4-litre  or with the 1.6-litre  petrol engines.

There was also a crossover version of the Polo, with off-road styling, named Polo Fun (Polo Dune in the UK, Polo Soho in Spain, CrossPolo in South Africa), released in 2003 - despite its appearance the car was never available with 4WD. According to Volkswagen, the following generation of the Polo would receive the 4motion (four-wheel-drive) option.

Engines

Sedan
A sedan version was launched in November 2003. It was produced in Brazil, South Africa and China and exported to the rest of Latin America and Australia, as well as to Europe. With the introduction of the Polo Classic saloon in the Australian market in 2004, the Chinese version, has the distinction of being the first Chinese-built car to be produced in right-hand drive.

Compared to the hatchback model, the Polo Sedan (also "Saloon" or "Limousine") is completely re-styled from the B-pillar rearwards. The window line has a slight upward incline and the roof features Volkswagen’s trademark curves and the concise styling of the C-pillar provides aspects that are actually reminiscent of a coupe. At the rear, the large horizontally divided rear lights and sculptured panels complete a design that is classically Volkswagen.

Overall, the Polo Sedan is 28 centimetres longer than the hatchback version (4179 mm vs 3897 mm). Consequently, with the rear seatback in place, the Polo Sedan offers 461 Litres of boot capacity (211 litres more than the hatchback siblings) and with the rear seats folded down, 1127 litres of storage capacity is available.

Transmission is a five-speed manual.

Standard features including dual front and side airbags, semi-automatic air conditioning, CD player, ABS brakes and remote central locking with engine immobiliser.

Facelift
In May 2005, the Polo Mk4 was facelifted, creating the Mk4F (internal designation Typ 9N3) moniker, with new headlights, taillights and a different hatch, which resembled other recently launched models in the Volkswagen line-up of the time.  The Typ 9N3 came in six different trims, ranging from the basic E model to the GTI.  Like its predecessor, the standard models use the same engine range from the 1.2 L 55 PS (40 kW) 3-cylinder engine to the 1.9 L  TDI engine. A 9N3 model Polo with a 2.0L 8v petrol engine shared with the Mk4 Golf 2.0, was also available specific to the South African market from 2005-2007, badged under the 'Highline' trim.

Polo GTI
With the introduction of the Polo Mk4, the Polo GTI Mk3 was discontinued and was given no direct replacement. It was not until late 2005 that the Polo GTI was reintroduced. It was unveiled on 21 October 2005 at the Australian International Motor Show. It featured a 20-valve turbocharged 1.8-litre  petrol engine which had been used in models such as the Golf GTI Mk4 and the Passat Mk5.

Its styling bears some resemblance to the Mk5 Golf GTI, with a blacked out central "scoop" in the bumper surrounding the honeycomb grille. In this new model the fully digital climate control is optional and xenon lights are not available, unlike the Polo GTI Mk3 which featured them as standard. Although faster than the previous model, the Polo GTI Mk4 is less powerful than the top versions of the Opel/Vauxhall Corsa, BMW MINI and its stablemate SEAT Ibiza, most of which come with engines with a maximum output above  .

Polo Vivo 
On 11 March 2010, Volkswagen South Africa announced that the Volkswagen Citi Golf is being replaced by a version of the Mk 4 Polo, the Polo Vivo. It is available with a choice of two 1.4-litre engines (55 kW & 63 kW) and a 1.6-litre engine (77 kW). The Polo Vivo is sold in both 3-door and 5-door versions and as a saloon.

In comparison to the Polo Mk4, the Polo Vivo has a restyled front bumper and grille, deleted scuff strips on the bumpers and sides of the car, and side indicators relocated from the wing mirrors back to the front fenders. This restyling gives the Polo Vivo some of the elements of the design language used in other contemporary VW models. It is manufactured at VW's Uitenhage plant in South Africa, which sources 70% of the Vivo parts locally. This model was discontinued in 2018 and this marked the first generation, replaced by a new model based on the Mark 5 Polo.

CrossPolo/ Polo Fun / Polo Dune / Polo Soho 
There was also a crossover-inspired version of the Polo, similar to the Rover Streetwise, with "off-road" styling, named Polo Fun (Polo Dune in the UK, Polo Soho in Spain, CrossPolo in South Africa), but despite its appearance the car was never available with 4motion four-wheel drive.

A mini SUV-styled (but still two-wheel-drive) CrossPolo version of the Mark IVF was also produced as a successor to the Polo Fun for several markets.

Polo BlueMotion 
In 2006, Volkswagen premiered its BlueMotion range with the emphasis of lower emissions and high fuel economy. Volkswagen's first car under the BlueMotion range is a modified 1.4-litre VW Polo TDI with longer gear ratios, aerodynamic changes and lightweight alloys with low rolling resistant tyres. The end result is a car capable of producing less than 100g/km of CO2 with a stated fuel economy of 74.3 mpg (3.8 L/100 km) on a combined cycle. Volkswagen plans to use the platform set by the Polo on expanding their BlueMotion ranges which include the Volkswagen Golf and the Volkswagen Passat.

Safety

The Polo in its most basic version for Latin America received 4 stars for adult occupants and 3 stars for toddlers from Latin NCAP in 2012.

Motorsport
Volkswagen Racing rallied a Polo Super 1600 in the 2003 Junior World Rally Championship, winning the Turkish round, with Kosti Katajamäki as the driver. The 1.6-litre engine developed  to the front wheels.

Volkswagen Racing in South Africa rallied a Super 2000 Polo, that won the South African Rally Driver and Navigator Championship for four consecutive years since 2005.

See also
Volkswagen Polo, an overview of all models
Volkswagen Polo Mk1
Volkswagen Polo Mk2
Volkswagen Polo Mk3
Volkswagen Polo Mk5
Volkswagen Polo Mk6

References

External links

 Volkswagen UK's Polo Site
 Volkswagen Australia's Polo Site
 Polo Mark IV/IVF review - Parkers
 Polo Mark VF review - What Car
Volkswagen Launches Polo Classic Sedan

Polo 4
Cars introduced in 2001
Cars discontinued in 2017
Subcompact cars
Front-wheel-drive vehicles
Hatchbacks
Latin NCAP superminis